THH may refer to:

 Hillingdon Hospital, an NHS hospital in Hillingdon, London
 Tetrahydroharmine, a fluorescent indole alkaloid 
 Thomas Henry Huxley (1825–1895), English biologist, comparative anatomist and supporter of Darwin's theory of evolution
 The Helping Hand (halfway house), a non-governmental halfway house in Singapore with a Christian ministry
 Topological Hochschild homology, a mathematical construction which assigns functorially a cyclotomic spectrum to any ring spectrum in homotopy theory.
 The Haunted House, a Tooniverse animated television series

See also

Haunted house (disambiguation)